Moskalensky District is an administrative and municipal district (raion), one of the thirty-two in Omsk Oblast, Russia. It is located in the southwest of the oblast. Its administrative center is the urban locality (a work settlement) of Moskalenki. Population: 28,968 (2010 Census);  The population of Moskalenki accounts for 32.1% of the district's total population.

References

Notes

Sources

Districts of Omsk Oblast